Cynthia Carmen Burbridge-Bishop (born December 30, 1978) or Sirinya Burbridge, is a Thai model, actress, beauty pageant titleholder and activist. She is best known as the host and judge on Asia's Next Top Model.

Early life
Bishop was born in Bangkok and raised in Pattaya. Her father, William Burbridge, is American and her mother, Patricia, is half English, one-quarter Indian and one-quarter Thai. Bishop attended Ruamrudee International School in Bangkok and  graduated from Public Relations at Bangkok University

In 2005, she married Byron Bishop, a Japanese American model and had two children, Leila Carmen and Aiden.

Career 
Bishop started diving at the age of 5 and through this landed her first modelling contract for an underwater commercial shoot for a diving equipment store.

In 1996, Bishop won the Miss Thailand World pageant and represented Thailand in the Miss World pageant in Bangalore, India where she was unplaced and didn't make it to the semi-finals.

Bishop's work in films include The King Maker, which she was nominated for best supporting actress at the 2005 Suphanahong Awards in Thailand, and All I See is You (2016). She has also starred in numerous Thai drama series such as Gossip Girl: Thailand, playing the role of Lily Wijitranukul, City Of Light (The OC Thailand) (Thai adaptation of the original American series), Clueless and From Dreams to Eternity.

In 2016, Bishop presented the fourth cycle of Asia's Next Top Model and still continues her role until the sixth cycle in 2018. She also hosted 2 episodes of Britain's Next Top Model Cycle 12.

In 2021, Bishop starred in F4 Thailand: Boys Over Flowers, the Thai adaptation of the popular Japanese shōjo manga Boys Over Flowers by Yoko Kamio. She played the role of Thyme's (Bright aka Vachirawit Chivaaree ) mother.

Social Movement 
In 2018, Bishop launched a social-media campaign, #DontTellMeHowToDress. Later she posted a video with her message "Don’t tell women what to wear; tell men to respect women" that has taken the internet by storm. Bishop teamed up with the Thai Women and Men Progressive Movement Foundation and UN Women turned the campaign into an exhibition, starting Jun 25, 2018, to raise awareness of sexual harassment and victim-blaming in Thailand.

Awards
Bishop was on the list of the BBC's 100 Women announced on 23 November 2020.

Filmography

Film

Television

TV Series

TV Program

Awards and nominations

References

External links

1978 births
Living people
Cindy Bishop
Cindy Bishop
Cindy Bishop
Cindy Bishop
Cindy Bishop
Cindy Bishop
Miss World 1996 delegates
Cindy Bishop
Cindy Bishop
Cindy Bishop
Cindy Bishop
Cindy Bishop
Cindy Bishop
VJs (media personalities)
BBC 100 Women
Miss Thailand World